Roger Harrington may refer to:

People 

 Roger Fuller Harrington (born 1925), American electrical engineer and professor
 Roger Lee Harrington (19671995), American airport shuttle driver murdered by Mark Winger

Fictional character 

 Roger Harrington, principal of Midtown High School (Marvel Comics)